Banat-i is a hill located in Bool, Tagbilaran City. This hill commands a scenic view overlooking the vast Bohol Sea, Islands of Mindanao, Negros and Siquijor and the strait of Panglao Island. Elevation is 146 meters above sea level.

Tagbilaran
Landforms of Bohol
Hills of the Philippines